The following lists events that happened during 1993 in Rwanda.

Incumbents 
 President: Juvénal Habyarimana
 Prime Minister: Dismas Nsengiyaremye (until 18 July), Agathe Uwilingiyimana (starting 18 July)

Events

August
 August 4 - The Arusha Accords are signed between President Juvénal Habyarimana and leaders of the RPF in Arusha, Tanzania, ending the Rwandan Civil War.

References

 
Years of the 20th century in Rwanda
1990s in Rwanda
Rwanda
Rwanda